Dall Island is an island in the Alexander Archipelago off the southeast coast of Alaska, just west of Prince of Wales Island and north of Canadian waters. Dall is used economically for fishing and limestone quarrying.

Population and demographics
The 2000 census recorded 20 persons living on the island. The Haida are known to have inhabited coastal caves on the island two to three thousand years ago.

History

Dall Island was first called "Quadra", after Juan Francisco de la Bodega y Quadra, until 1879, when it was renamed in honor of naturalist William H. Dall. The island also had been thought to be part of Prince of Wales Island as recently as 1903.

During the maritime fur trade era several harbors on southeast Dall Island, collectively known as Kaigani, were among the most popular sites for trade between fur trading ships and the Kaigani Haida.

Cape Muzon, the southernmost point of the island, is the western terminus, known as Point A, of the A–B Line, which marks the marine boundary between the state of Alaska and the Canadian province of British Columbia, per the position of the Canadian government on the decision of the arbitration tribunal under the Alaska Boundary Treaty of 1903. This line is also the northern boundary of the waters known as the Dixon Entrance. Cape Muzon was established as the "point of commencement" of the international boundary between Russia and British North America in the Anglo-Russian Convention of 1825.  The U.S. Coast and Geodetic Survey charts produced in 1884 and 1894–95 laid down the boundary line with Canada from Cape Muzon through Dixon Entrance and Portland Canal. In its decision on the delimitation of the disputed Alaska Panhandle boundary, the six-judge 1903 Court of Arbitration unanimously agreed that Cape Muzon was the initial point of the boundary and designated Point A as one endpoint of the A–B Line.

Canada considers Point A as part of the delimited international boundary, just like the other defined turning points set forth in 1903 for the resolved boundary. Furthermore, Canada regards the A–B line as defining Canada's internal waters within the Dixon Entrance. On the other hand, the U.S. regards the A–B line as having been defined to allocate sovereignty over the land masses within the Dixon Entrance, with Canada's land to the south of the line, while it considers the waters to be subject to international marine law.

Logging

Dall Island is also an island used for its timber resource. The island houses many logging camps. Columbia Helicopters of Oregon is one of the main companies using the island for its timber.

References

External links

Islands of the Alexander Archipelago
Islands of Prince of Wales–Hyder Census Area, Alaska
Islands of Alaska
Islands of Unorganized Borough, Alaska
International islands